was a town located in Chikujō District, Fukuoka Prefecture, Japan.

As of 2003, the town had an estimated population of 11,944 and a density of 231.03 persons per km². The total area was 51.70 km².

On January 10, 2006, Shiida, along with the town of Tsuiki (also from Chikujō District), was merged to create the town of Chikujō.

External links
 Chikujō official website 

Dissolved municipalities of Fukuoka Prefecture
Geography of Fukuoka Prefecture
Populated places disestablished in 2006
2006 disestablishments in Japan